Kevin Volans (born 26 July 1949) is a South African born Irish composer and pianist. He studied with Karlheinz Stockhausen and Mauricio Kagel in Cologne in the 1970s and later became associated with the Neue Einfacheit (New Simplicity) movement in the city. In the late 1970s he became interested in the indigenous music of his homeland and began a series of pieces which attempted to combine aspects of African and contemporary European music. Although Volans later moved away from any direct engagement with African music, certain residual elements such as interlocking rhythms, repetition and open forms are still detectable in his music since the early 1990s which takes a new direction more redolent of certain schools of abstract art. He settled in Ireland permanently in 1986 and was granted Irish citizenship in 1995.

Biography 
During his teenage years Volans developed an interest in the music of the post-war avant garde as well as abstract painting. He pursued a Bachelor of Music degree at the University of the Witwatersrand graduating in 1972. After postgraduate study at the University of Aberdeen he moved in 1973 to Cologne, where he became one of only five students admitted to Stockhausen's composition class at the Musikhochschule. He became intimately acquainted with Stockhausen's extensions of serial technique and eventually became his teaching assistant in 1975–76, replacing Richard Toop. He also took lessons in music theatre from Mauricio Kagel as well as taking piano lessons from Aloys Kontarsky and studying electronic music with Hans-Ulrich Humpert.

While in Cologne Volans became increasingly dissatisfied with the new-music movement in the city, which he perceived to be dogmatic and creatively restricting. Alongside other composers such as Walter Zimmermann, Gerald Barry, and Michael von Biel, Volans began to question the hegemony of the prevailing new-music style that was based on an extension of the serial techniques of the previous generation. This group of composers, loosely referred to as the Cologne School, marked the start of the Neue Einfachheit (New Simplicity) movement which began with a concert series organised by Zimmermann in January 1977. Composers linked with the New Simplicity generally sought a more transparent and direct style, an openness to aspects of tonality and a freedom to use pre-existing material quite in contrast to the intense abstraction of the post-war avant garde.

Africa series 
Despite having grown up in South Africa, Volans had little contact with the indigenous music of his homeland due to apartheid strictures which largely prohibited the intermingling of black and white cultures. It wasn't until he was commissioned by Westdeutscher Rundfunk (WDR) to undertake a number of field trips between 1976 and 1979 to South Africa to record various kinds of indigenous African music that he began to actively take an interest in this music. These field trips alerted him to aspects of indigenous African culture, both musical and visual, which he had previously overlooked. He thus set about planning a series of works in which he attempted to reconcile African and European aesthetics. At the start of the series Volans envisaged that the African source material would be quite recognizable but as the series progressed he would gradually exercise more and more intervention into it so that by the end of the series the African material would be fully assimilated into his own style:

As a political statement, Volans, as a white South African, felt that the series might lend some sort of contribution to the struggle against apartheid and some performances were met with protests from the musical establishment in South Africa. The most well-known piece from the series is White Man Sleeps (1982) for two harpsichords, viola da gamba and percussion. In this piece Volans attempted to "Africanize" Western European art music by transferring paraphrases and transcriptions of Venda, San, Nyungwe and Lesotho music, as well as his own material, onto re-tuned period instruments. The subsequent reworking of the piece for a recording by the Kronos Quartet became one of the biggest-selling string-quartet releases of all time. The works immediately following White Man Sleeps, such as the second and third quartets, continue to use some African references, but display an increasing preoccupation with non-directional narratives influenced by the uneven and often random patterns present in African textiles, as well as the open approach to time present in the late works of Morton Feldman.

Towards abstraction 
Despite the success of the African series, Volans began to find himself increasingly categorized as an "African" composer—a label which he found creatively restricting. In the late 1980s he began to pursue a new direction, developing a style characterized by an overall tendency towards increasing abstraction occasionally punctuated by works where literal African elements once again re-emerge. This is clearly seen in works such as Chevron (1990) and One Hundred Frames (1991), as well as his opera The Man with Footsoles of Wind (1993) based on the last year of the life of the 19th-century poet Arthur Rimbaud. A parallel development to this was his increasing interest in writing for dance, an art-form particularly suited to Volans's open conception of formal structure and he has collaborated with the choreographers Jonathan Burrows, Siobhan Davies and Shobana Jeyasingh.

The key work which confirmed this new direction is Cicada (1994) for two pianos, which was inspired by his experience inside one of James Turrell's Skyspaces. The piece involves very gradual adjustments of tone, harmonic colour and tempo being applied to a repeated sonority based on a B-flat major and A major triads. Described by the composer as his first minimalist piece, Cicada'''s reduction in content and largely flat surface is a departure from the generally high degree of activity which marked many of his earlier works. Although there is no recognizably African material present in the piece, the existence of interlocking patterns, inherent rhythms and open non-developmental forms demonstrate how African elements continue to inform his work in a background capacity.

In a number of works since Cicada, Volans limited the content and pursued a similar policy of incremental changes at the margins of the material. The reduction of material in these pieces is even more extreme than in Cicada and exemplifies a tendency which Volans has described as follows:

Two works in particular demonstrate this tendency – String Quartet No. 6 and the Concerto for Double Orchestra. String Quartet No. 6 is not in fact a string quartet at all but a piece for two spatially separated string quartets which can be performed live with both quartets or with one live and the other pre-recorded. The vast majority of the piece consists of just two chords which overlap between both quartets creating a blurring of the harmonies not unlike the blurring of colour fields in the paintings of Mark Rothko, which served as the piece's inspiration. In the Concerto for Double Orchestra (2001) static harmonies are spatially distributed back and forth between a split orchestra with a focus on the "edges" of the chords through accented pizzicatos and dynamics rather than "bleeding" them together. Both of these works demonstrate Volans's concerns with moving the site of musical discourse to the margins of the material, a strategy inspired by his lifelong interest in visual art. The music tends to focus on the interplay between dynamics, voicings, register, timbre and types of attack; parameters which are usually considered secondary to larger-scale transformations in the domain of pitch and rhythm. The reduced approach to content directs attention towards changes in the slightest details and encourages a form of engagement perhaps more prevalent in the world of visual art.

This tendency towards reduction is not universal, however. Perhaps due to the inherent nature of the medium, Volans's concertante works such as the Trio Concerto (2005) and the Piano Concerto No. 2 (2006) are notable for their virtuosic writing and dynamism. Volans's most recent work constitutes yet another phase of development. Beginning with The Partenheimer Project (2007), much of the new work explores the interaction between individual parts playing independently of each other to some degree. The Partenheimer Project is spatially separated into three ensembles while both Violin: Piano (2008) and Cello: Piano (2008) contain instruments playing at different tempi propelled for the most part by irregular repetition. The transparent scoring and negation of any sense of goal-orientated progression lends the music a static floating quality.

While Volans's music has often been viewed as a reaction to the perceived excesses of serialism, it is nevertheless significant that his approach to dynamics and articulation is always structurally rather than expressively directed. In this way, Volans identifies with the tradition of modernism and his music studiously avoids any lapses into postmodern nostalgia. He has been described by the music critic Kyle Gann as:

In 1997 the BBC Music Magazine listed Volans as one of the 50 most important living composers. In 1999 the Southbank Centre in London hosted a 50th birthday celebration of his work, for his 60th the Wigmore Hall in London organised a "Kevin Volans Day" of concerts, and in 2019 the Wigmore Hall again had a concert celebrating his 70th birthday.

Students

Volans taught composition at the University of Natal, where he received a DMus in 1986. He was also composer in residence at Queen's University Belfast (1986–89) and at Princeton University (1992). Since moving to Ireland in 1985 he has exerted a considerable influence on the direction of music in the country through his teaching. His notable students include, Andrew Hamilton, Jennifer Walshe, Simon O'Connor, Deirdre Gribbin, Elaine Agnew, Deirdre MacKay, Jonathan Nangle and Juergen Simpson.

Discography
 She Who Sleeps with a Small Blanket (Robin Schulkowsky, CD, Sony, 1985)
 String Quartet No. 1: 'White Man Sleeps' (Kronos Quartet, CD, Elektra Nonesuch, 1987)
 String Quartet No. 1: 'White Man Sleeps', (Dance no. 1) (Kronos Quartet, CD, Elektra Nonesuch, 1987)
 String Quartet No. 1: 'White Man Sleeps', Mbira, She Who Sleeps with a Small Blanket, White Man Sleeps (Original version) (The Smith Quartet, Kevin Volans, Robert Hill, Margriet Tindemans, Robin Schuikowsky, CD, Landor, 1990)
 'Norwegian Wood: Happiness is a Warm Gun' (Lennon, arr. Volans) (Aki Takahashi, CD, EMI, 1991)
 String Quartet No. 2: 'Hunting Gathering' (Kronos Quartet, CD, Elektra Nonesuch, 1991)
 String Quartet No. 1: 'White Man Sleeps' (Kronos Quartet, CD, Elektra Nonesuch, 1992)
 String Quartet No. 3: 'The Songlines' (3 rd movement) (Balanescu Quartet, CD, Argos, 1994)
 String Quartet No. 2: 'Hunting Gathering', String Quartet No. 3: 'The Songlines' (Balanescu Quartet, CD, Decca/Argo, 1994)
 String Quartet No. 5: 'Dancers on a Plane', String Quartet No. 4: 'The Ramanujan Notebooks', Movement for String Quartet (The Duke Quartet, CD, Collins Classics, 1994)
 Mbira (Kevin Volans Ensemble, CD, WDR World Network Recording, 1995)
 White man Sleeps (Guitar version of Dance No. 4) (Tilman Hoppstock, CD, Signum, 1995) Into Darkness (Sequenza, CD, Neuma, 1998)
 This is How it is, Walking song, Leaping Dance, Concerto for Piano and Wind Instruments, Untitled (Netherlands Wind Ensemble, cond. Wim Steinmann and Daniel Harding, CD, Chandos, 1999)
 Cicada, Duets (Mathilda Hornsveld, Jill Richards, CD, Black Box, 2000)
 This is How it is (Netherlands Wind Ensemble, cond. Wim Steinmann, CD, CMC, 2001)
 String Quartet No. 2: 'Hunting; Gathering', String Quartet No. 6, String Quartet No. 1: 'White Man Sleeps' (The Duke Quartet, CD, Black Box, 2002)
 White Man Sleeps (Guitar Quartet Version) (Dublin Guitar Quartet, CD, Grelslate Records, 2005)
 Piano Trio (Fidelio Trio, CD, NMC, 2008)
 Walking Song (David Adams, CD, All Write Music, 2008)
 Akrodha, Asange, She Who Sleeps with a Small Blanket (Jonny Axelsson, CD, 2008)
 The Partenheimer Project (Birmingham Contemporary Music Group, CD, Ikon Gallery/Kunstmuseum Bonn, 2008)
 Four Guitars (Dublin Guitar Quartet, CD, CMC, 2009)

Filmography
 Dance Films by Adam Roberts (Duke Quartet, Kevin Volans, DVD, The Jonathan Burrows Group, 1995)
 Zeno at 4am. (Sontonga Quartet, Pumeza Matshikiza, Lwazi Ncube, William Kentridge, DVD, Marian Goodman Gallery, 2002)
 Evidenti: A Film Conceived By Sylvie Guillem (Duke Quartet, DVD, NVC Arts, 1995)

Selected compositions
Stage
 Correspondences, Dance Opera (1990)
 The Man with Footsoles of Wind, Chamber opera (1993)

Orchestra
 One Hundred Frames (1991)
 Concerto for Double Orchestra (2001)
 Strip-Weave for Orchestra (2002–03)
 Symphony: Daar Kom die Alibama (2010)

Soloist with orchestra
 Concerto for Piano and Wind Instruments (1995)
 Cello Concerto (1997)
 Trio Concerto (2005)
 Piano Concerto No. 2 'Atlantic Crossing' (2006)
 Piano Concerto no. 3 (2010)
 Chakra for 3 percussionists and Orchestra (2011)
 Piano Concerto no. 4 (2014)
 Concerto for Uilleann Pipes and large Orchestra (2016/17)
 Concerto for solo Percussion and ensemble (2012)

Chamber music
 Matepe (1980)
 White Man Sleeps (1982)
 Walking Song (1984)
 Leaping Dance (1984)
 Kneeling Dance (1984 rev. 1987)
 String Quartet No. 1 'White Man Sleeps' (1986)
 String Quartet No. 2 'Hunting: Gathering'(1987)
 String Quartet No. 3 'The Songlines' (1988 rev. 1993)
 Chevron (1990)
 Cicada (1994)
 String Quartet No. 5 'Dancers on a Plane' (1994)
 Untitled (1996)
 String Quartet No. 6 (2000)
 1000 bars (2002)
Chakra for 3 percussionists (2003)
 Piano Trio (2002, rev. 2005)
 Shiva Dances (2006)
 The Partenheimer Project (2007)
 Mr. Handel's Return (2008)
 Violin: Piano (2008)
 Viola: Piano (2008)
 Cello: Piano (2009)
 Trumpet, Vibe, Cello, Piano (2009)
 No Translation (2009)
 Piano Trio No. 2 (2009)
 String Quartet no. 11 (2013)
 Looping Point (2012)
 Turning Point (2013)
 Calefaccion (2013)
 Matepe for Calefax (2013)
 7 Flutes (2014)
 Abhaya (2014)
 7 Bass Winds (2015)
 4 Marimbas (2015)
 String Quartet no. 12 (2015)
 perc : piano 1 (2015)
 Akrodha 3 (2015)
 for Bob (2015)
 perc : piano 2 (2016)
 C.Roll.A.eS.H. (2016)
 cello:piano 2 (2016)
 Spoor (2017)
 Piano Trio no. 3 (2017)
 Seven Clarinets and One Flute (2017)
 clarinet:violin:piano (with CPE) (2017)
 Blackbird:Blackbird 1–4 for 2 pianos (2018)

Solo instrumental
 clarinet:solo (2015)
 L'Africaine (2016)

Solo percussion
 She Who Sleeps with a Small Blanket (1985)
 Asanga (1997)
 Akrodha (1998)

Solo piano
 Three Structural Etudes (2004)
 Three Rhythmic Etudes (2003)
 Piano Etudes Nos. 7 & 8 (2008)
 Piano Etude No. 9 (2008)
 3 Books of Piano pieces for 'Young' Players (2012)
 PMB Impromptu (2014)
 Piano Etude No. 10 (2015, withdrawn)
 Piano Etude No. 11 (2015, rev. 2018)
 Piano Etude No. 12 (2015, rev. 2018)
 Marabi Nights (2016)
 53,73369155794372 notes a second, for Clare for midi keyboard (2016)

Vocal
 Gloso a lo Divino (2006)
 Canciones del Alma (2009)
 3 Xhosa songs (2012)
 The Mountain that Left (2013)

References

Sources

 
 
 
 
   
  
 
  .
 
 
   .
 
 
 
 
 

Further reading

 Anon. n.d. (a) "Volans, Kevin". CMC Composer Profile. .
 Ballantine, Christopher. 2001–2002. "Christopher Ballantine reviews Cicada". NewMusicSA: Bulletin of the International Society for Contemporary Music – South African Section, First Issue, 7–8.
 Blake, Michael. 1992. "Volans, Kevin". In Contemporary Composers, eds. Brian Norton and Pamela Collins, 951–952.
 Blake, Michael. 1993. "Almeida opera: Kevin Volans and Julian Grant". Tempo 186, 52–53.
 Bräuninger, Jürgen. 1998. "Gumboots to the Rescue". South African Journal of Musicology: SAMUS 18, 1–16.
 Clarkson Fletcher, J., J. Dazeley, J. Taylor, and E. Wetherall. n.d. "Towards New Models for the Analysis of Post-serial and Post-tonal Music, with Particular Reference to Kevin Volans' White Man Sleeps". In Proceedings of the 25th Annual Congress of the Musicological Society of Southern Africa, Grahamstown, August 1998, ed. W. Lüdemann, 7–18. [Stellenbosch: Musicological Society of Southern Africa.]
 Fox, James. 1988. "Staging Songlines: Interview". The Village Voice 18, no. 12:138–139, 199, 202.
 Gaisford, Sue. 1999. "How We Met: Elizabeth Chatwin & Kevin Volans". The Independent (London), 4 July.
 Gann, Kyle. 1988. "Boston Composers and Kronos Quartets: Fear of Symmetry". The Village Voice (23 February): 76.
 Gann, Kyle. 1998b. "Consumer Guide". The Village Voice 43, no. 35 (1 September): 64.
 . 2006. "'Zur Freiheit führen viele Wege': Der Componist Kevin Volans über Afrika und die Musikalische Avantgarde". Neue Zeitschrift für Musik 5, September/October, 16–17.
 Loppert, Max. 1993. "Volans: The Man Who Strides The Wind". Opera, 68, 1102–1104.
 Marcus, Bunita. 1989. "Preface". New Observations 67:2.
 Olwage, Grant. 1999–2000. "Who Needs Rescuing? A Reply to 'Gumboots to the Rescue'". South African Journal of Musicology: SAMUS 19, 105–108.
 Potter, Keith. 1982. "Repetitive Music Again (and Again)". Classical Music 28 August 1982.
 Pooley, Thomas M. 2008. "Composition in Crisis: Case Studies in South African Art Music 1980–2006". Unpublished MA Dissertation: University of the Witwatersrand.
 Rörich, Mary. "Three Rhythmic Etudes. Dublin: Black Sheep Edition, 2002; Three Structural Etudes. Dublin: Black Sheep Edition, 2003" [score review]. South African Journal of Musicology: SAMUS 25, 151–154.
 Scherzinger, Martin. 2004. "Art Music in a Cross-cultural Context: The Case of Africa". In The Cambridge History of Twentieth-century Music, eds. N. Cook and A. Pople, 584–613. Cambridge: Cambridge University Press.
 Scherzinger, Martin. 2004–2005. "Of Sleeping White Men: Analytic Silence in the Critical Reception of Kevin Volans". NewMusicSA: Bulletin of the International Society for Contemporary Music – South African Section, Third and Fourth Issue, 22–26.
 Scherzinger, Martin. 2008. "Who's 'White Man Sleeps'? Aesthetics and Politics in the Early Work of Kevin Volans". In Composing Apartheid: Music For and Against Apartheid, edited by Grant Olwage, 209–235. Johannesburg: Wits University Press.
 
 Taylor, Timothy D. 2001. "Volans, Kevin". The New Grove Dictionary of Music and Musicians, second edition, edited by Stanley Sadie and John Tyrrell. London: Macmillan.
 Taylor, Timothy D. n.d. "Volans, Kevin". Grove Music Online, edited by Dean Roote.
 Walton, Christopher. 2002–2003. "Kevin Volans 'String Quartets Nos. 1, 2 & 6'". NewMusicSA: Bulletin of the International Society for Contemporary Music – South African Section, Second Issue'', 22–24.

External links

Contemporary Music Centre, composer page
Biography of Kevin Volans at musicsalesclassical.com
Dictionary of African Composers
Field recordings made by Kevin Volans of music from Lesotho and South Africa

1949 births
20th-century classical composers
21st-century classical composers
Alumni of Maritzburg College
Alumni of the University of Aberdeen
Irish classical composers
Living people
Irish male classical composers
People from Pietermaritzburg
Pupils of Karlheinz Stockhausen
South African composers
South African male composers
South African emigrants to Ireland
South African people of British descent
White South African people
20th-century male musicians
21st-century male musicians